Luis Fernando León Bermeo (born 11 April 1993) is an Ecuadorian professional footballer who plays as a defender for C.S. Emelec on loan from Liga MX club Atlético San Luis.

References

1993 births
Living people
Ecuadorian footballers
Ecuador international footballers
C.S.D. Independiente del Valle footballers
2021 Copa América players
People from Los Ríos Province
Association football defenders
Atlético San Luis footballers
Barcelona S.C. footballers
C.S. Emelec footballers